Robert Clarence Irwin (born 1 December 2003) is an Australian television personality, actor, conservationist, zookeeper, and wildlife photographer. He is the son of Steve Irwin, and is often noted by fans to share similarities with his late father.

Irwin hosts Robert's Real Life Adventures, a program on his family zoo's internal television network. He co-hosted the Discovery Kids Channel television series Wild But True and co-created the book series Robert Irwin: Dinosaur Hunter. He currently stars on the Animal Planet series Crikey! It's the Irwins with his mother, Terri, and sister, Bindi.

Irwin works at the Australia Zoo, where he is involved in activities that Steve originally did, such as wrestling crocodiles, handling snakes and feeding the zoo's animals.

Early life 
Robert Clarence Irwin was born on 1 December 2003 in Buderim, Queensland, the younger of two children and the only son of Steve and Terri Irwin. His father died from a stingray injury to the heart while filming an underwater documentary when Robert was two years old. Robert and his sister, Bindi, were homeschooled at Australia Zoo following their father's death. He is a dual citizen of Australia (through his birth) and the United States (through his mother). His ancestry is English and abundance of Irish on his father's side.

During a public show one month after Robert was born, his father carried him in his arm while hand-feeding a chicken carcass to a  saltwater crocodile. Robert was close to the crocodile and the incident sparked comparisons in the press to Michael Jackson's dangling of his son, Prince Michael Jackson II, outside a German hotel window. The incident prompted the Queensland Government to change its crocodile-handling laws, banning children and untrained adults from entering crocodile enclosures.

Career 

In 2009, Irwin had a cameo appearance in Free Willy: Escape from Pirate's Cove. In 2012, Irwin appeared alongside his mother and sister in a television series entitled Steve Irwin's Wildlife Warriors, which earned him a 2013 Logie Award nomination for Most Popular New Male Talent. In 2014 and 2015, Irwin co-hosted a television series named Wild But True on Discovery Kids Channel. The show was later nominated for an International Emmy Kids Award in the factual category in 2016.

In 2013, Irwin released a series of books, titled Dinosaur Hunter, which he co-authored with Lachlan Creag and Jack Wells.

In 2015, he appeared as a guest on the British wildlife series Ten Deadliest Snakes in the episode focused on Australia's venomous snakes. He guided presenter Nigel Marven in the billabong of Australia Zoo to look for a red-bellied black snake.

Irwin was runner-up in the junior category of the 2016 Australian Geographic Nature Photographer of the Year competition. Irwin is also a photography contributor to the Australia Zoo Crikey magazine. He uses his love for photography to help raise awareness about wildlife conservation. He has also raised tens of thousands of dollars for the Irwins' non-profit organization Wildlife Warriors by auctioning canvas prints of his work at events around the world. He has also met with world leaders such as His Royal Highness Prince Charles to discuss the protection of natural habitat.

On 16 February 2017, Irwin made his late-night television debut when he appeared on NBC's The Tonight Show Starring Jimmy Fallon. He presented an African dwarf crocodile, a screaming armadillo, a red-tailed boa, and a sloth to the host, Jimmy Fallon. Irwin subsequently went back to appear on The Tonight Show on multiple occasions, showcasing a different selection of animals each time. As of April 2019, Irwin has appeared on the show eleven times.

Irwin is also an avid photographer and is also the leading photography contributor to the Australia Zoo Crikey magazine. He has also embarked upon many photography expeditions around the globe, from the savannah of Africa to the mountains of New Zealand, the wilderness of Europe and everywhere in between.

On 6 April 2017, Irwin was invested as a member and ambassador of Scouts Australia, formalising a partnership between the organisation and Australia Zoo. The aim of the partnership is to encourage Australia's young people to become involved with wilderness and conservation.
He has also given various interviews to magazines for teenagers as a current reference, such as Vanity

On Australia Zoo TV, Irwin appears on his own channel.

Filmography

Film

Television

References

External links 

 Robert Irwin Photos
 Robert Irwin at IMDB
 Wild Life Warriors
 Australia Zoo

2003 births
Living people
21st-century Australian male actors
Australian male child actors
Australian male film actors
Australian male television actors
Australian male voice actors
Australian people of American descent
Australian people of English descent
Australian people of Irish descent
Australian people of Swedish descent
Australian television personalities
Australian television presenters
Robert
Male actors from Queensland
People from Nambour, Queensland
People from the Sunshine Coast, Queensland
Steve Irwin